William M. Davis may refer to:

 William Morris Davis (1850–1934), American geographer, geologist and meteorologist
 William Morris Davis (congressman) (1815–1891), U.S. Representative from Pennsylvania

See also
 William Davis (disambiguation)